The Blue Knight is the second novel by former Los Angeles Police detective Joseph Wambaugh, written while he was still a serving detective. Published in 1972, it follows the last days on the beat for a veteran LAPD police officer, detailing his thoughts and actions from a first person perspective. The narrative is written in a coarse, sometimes self-deprecating manner; in the first chapter, Bumper refers to himself as having "an ass two nightsticks wide".

Plot summary
The novel is about a veteran LAPD beat cop named William "Bumper" Morgan, who utilizes intimidation and in some cases physical violence in his dealings with the criminal elements he encounters.  The book covers his last week on the job before his planned retirement.

Reception
According to WorldCat, the book was held in 1,621 libraries in 2014. It inspired the 1973 TV film, The Blue Knight and the 1975 TV series The Blue Knight.

References

American novels adapted into films
Novels by Joseph Wambaugh
1972 American novels
Little, Brown and Company books